Antoinette Sterling (January 23, 1841January 10, 1904) was an American contralto most known for singing sentimental ballads in Britain and the British Empire.

Early life
Sterling was born in Sterlingville, New York, on January 23, 1841. Her father, James Sterling, owned large blast furnaces, and she claimed to be a descendant of William Bradford. In childhood, she developed anti-British prejudices. Her young patriotic sympathies were so stirred by the story of the destruction of tea cargoes in Boston harbour that she resolved never to drink tea and kept the resolution all her life. She took a few singing lessons at eleven from Signor Abella in New York. In 1857, when she was sixteen, her father died, and she went to the state of Mississippi as a teacher, and after some time, she gave singing lessons.

When the civil war started, during the summer of 1862, she fled north by night, guided by African Americans. Afterward, she became a church singer at Henry Ward Beecher's church in Brooklyn, New York. In 1868, she came to Europe for further training, where she sang at Darlington in Handel's Messiah on December 17 and took lessons with W. H. Cummings in London before proceeding to Germany. 

She studied with Pauline Viardot-Garcia and with Manuel Garcia in London.  In 1871, she returned to America and became a concert singer.

Professional career in England and British Empire
She returned to England at the beginning of 1873, where she made her British singing debut in the Covent Garden Promenade Concerts and became known for singing ballads and Scotch songs.

Her first engagement in London was at the promenade concert on November 6, 1873; she insisted on singing the "Slumber Song" from Bach's Christmas Oratorio and some classical Lieder. Her success at the Crystal Palace, the Albert Hall, Exeter Hall, and St. James's Hall quickly followed. 

In February 1874, she sang in Mendelssohn's Elijah on two consecutive nights at Exeter Hall and Royal Albert Hall. Her repertoire was entirely oratorio music or German Lieder. Dissenting voices were not lacking; "her style is lacking in sensibility and refinement. The excellence of voice is not all that is required in the art of vocalisation" (Athenum, 14 March). She was engaged for the Three Choirs Festival at Hereford.

On Easter Sunday, 1875, she was married at the Savoy Chapel to John MacKinlay, a Scottish American. They settled in Stanhope Place, London. 

Engagements for high-class concerts gradually ceased, but she still sang in oratorio, and her taste remained faithful to the German school, including Wagner. In 1877, she found her vocation. Arthur Sullivan wrote "The Lost Chord" expressly for her, and it attained popularity. She was drawn more to simple sentimental ballads, especially those with semi-religious or moralising words. She invested "Caller Herrin'' with singular significance. In her later years, she favoured Tennyson's "Crossing the Bar" in Behrend's setting. 

She refused to wear a low-necked dress and received permission to dispense with one at a command performance before Queen Victoria. She never wore a corset. She became a believer in Christian Science after belonging to various sects.

Australia and New Zealand 
In 1893, she embarked on an Australasian tour for T. P. Hudson. Her tour of Australia included Adelaide, Melbourne, and Sydney. Her husband, having grown ill, remained behind in Adelaide while she toured the rest of Australia. She sang seven times in the Centennial Hall in Sydney to crowds totaling more than 25,000. Before traveling to New Zealand, she visited schools, hospitals, and social reform associations. When she arrived in Auckland from Sydney, she was greeted by Annie Jane Schnackenberg, national president of the Women's Christian Temperance Union of New Zealand. At their meeting at the Grand Hotel, Schnackenberg presented Sterling with a bouquet of white camellias (a suffragist symbol) and maiden hair fern "as a co-worker in the organisation." It was clear from a news article expounding on Sterling's career that her work was greatly admired: "Antoinette Sterling comes to show us how a perfect voice, perfectly educated, and controlled by a perceptive, devotional, and feeling mind, can lead us to heights and breadths and lengths and depths of musical delight such as we have not before understood." On July 9, 1893, while on her way to a concert in Dunedin, she received notice of her husband's death in Australia. She continued and performed at Garrison Hall before returning to Australia.

End of career and death
In 1895 she revisited America but soon returned to London.
 
In the winter of 1902–1903, her farewell tour was announced. Her last appearance was at East Ham on October 15, 1903, and the last song she sang was 'Crossing the Bar.' She died at her residence in Hampstead on January 10, 1904, and was cremated at Golder's Green, where she was interred.

Family
She was survived by a son and a daughter, both popular vocalists at the time. After her death, her son, Malcolm Sterling Mackinlay(1876–1952), wrote about her life in Antoinette Sterling and Other Celebrities (1906 Hutchinson). Her son's daughter was the romance novelist Leila Antoinette Sterling Mackinlay, who was named in her honour.

References

Attribution

External links

1841 births
1904 deaths
American expatriates in the United Kingdom
19th-century American women singers
19th-century American singers